Hockley, Gloucester County, is an unincorporated community in Gloucester County, Virginia.

References

Unincorporated communities in Virginia
Unincorporated communities in Gloucester County, Virginia